Skinny Living are a three-piece English indie soul band from Wakefield, West Yorkshire. The band is made up of a blend of vocalists, songwriters and musicians; namely Ryan Johnston (vocals), Will Booth (guitar), and Danny Hepworth (guitar).

The name Skinny Living describes the financial reality and lifestyle of the working class – hard graft on a low income with a lust for life, passion for family and an optimistic attitude about the future. The band signed to RCA Records in 2017, and then to Polydor in 2019. That same year saw them have their tracks featured on the likes of Clash Magazine, play over 250 shows, as well as being selected to headline Live at Leeds. In 2020 they were going to be touring with The Kaiser Chiefs, as well as headlining their own shows in London and Leeds.

With over 60 million streams worldwide, Skinny Living had a brief hiatus in 2020, when they signed to Parlophone and released a side project in the form of an EP called "Textures" under the alias 'New Familiar'.

References

English indie rock groups
English alternative rock groups
Musical groups established in 2013
Musical groups from Wakefield
2013 establishments in England